Gnosis is the common Greek noun for knowledge (γνῶσις, gnōsis, f.). The term was used among various Hellenistic religions and philosophies in the Greco-Roman world. It is best known for its implication within Gnosticism, where it signifies a spiritual knowledge or insight into humanity's real nature as divine, leading to the deliverance of the divine spark within humanity from the constraints of earthly existence.

Etymology 
Gnosis is a feminine Greek noun which means "knowledge" or "awareness." It is often used for personal knowledge compared with intellectual knowledge (εἴδειν eídein), as with the French connaître compared with savoir, the Spanish conocer compared with saber, the Italian conoscere compared with sapere, the German kennen rather than wissen, or the Modern Greek γνωρίζω compared with ξέρω.

A related term is the adjective gnostikos, "cognitive", a reasonably common adjective in Classical Greek. The terms do not appear to indicate any mystic, esoteric or hidden meaning in the works of Plato, but instead expressed a sort of higher intelligence and ability analogous to talent.

In the Hellenistic era the term became associated with the mystery cults.

In the Acts of Thomas, translated by G.R.S. Mead, the "motions of gnosis" are also referred to as "kingly motions".

Irenaeus used the phrase "knowledge falsely so-called" (from 1 Timothy 6:20) for the title of his book On the Detection and Overthrow of False Knowledge, that contains the adjective gnostikos, which is the source for the 17th-century English term "Gnosticism".

Comparison with epignosis 
The difference and meaning of epignosis contrasted with gnosis is disputed. One proposed distinction is between the abstract or fragmented knowledge (gnosis) and a clearer or more precise knowledge (epignosis). Other interpretations have suggested that 2 Peter is referring to an "epignosis of Jesus Christ", what J.B. Lightfoot described as a "larger and more thorough knowledge". Conversion to Christianity is seen as evidence of the deeper knowledge protecting against false doctrine.

Gnosticism 

Gnosticism originated in the late 1st century CE in non-rabbinical Jewish and early Christian sects. In the formation of Christianity, various sectarian groups, labeled "gnostics" by their opponents, emphasised spiritual knowledge (gnosis) of the divine spark within, over faith (pistis) in the teachings and traditions of the various communities of Christians. Gnosticism presents a distinction between the highest, unknowable God, and the Demiurge, "creator" of the material universe. The Gnostics considered the most essential part of the process of salvation to be this personal knowledge, in contrast to faith as an outlook in their worldview along with faith in the ecclesiastical authority.

In Gnosticism, the biblical serpent in the Garden of Eden was praised and thanked for bringing knowledge (gnosis) to Adam and Eve and thereby freeing them from the malevolent Demiurge's control. Gnostic Christian doctrines rely on a dualistic cosmology that implies the eternal conflict between good and evil, and a conception of the serpent as the liberating savior and bestower of knowledge to humankind opposed to the Demiurge or creator god, identified with the Hebrew God of the Old Testament. Gnostic Christians considered the Hebrew God of the Old Testament as the evil, false god and creator of the material universe, and the Unknown God of the Gospel, the father of Jesus Christ and creator of the spiritual world, as the true, good God. In the Archontic, Sethian, and Ophite systems, Yaldabaoth (Yahweh) is regarded as the malevolent Demiurge and false god of the Old Testament who generated the material universe and keeps the souls trapped in physical bodies, imprisoned in the world full of pain and suffering that he created.

However, not all Gnostic movements regarded the creator of the material universe as inherently evil or malevolent. For instance, Valentinians believed that the Demiurge is merely an ignorant and incompetent creator, trying to fashion the world as good as he can, but lacking the proper power to maintain its goodness. All Gnostics were regarded as heretics by the proto-orthodox Early Church Fathers.

Mandaeism 

In Mandaeism, the concept of manda ("knowledge", "wisdom", "intellect") is roughly equivalent to the Gnostic concept of gnosis. Mandaeism ('having knowledge') is the only surviving Gnostic religion from antiquity. Mandaeans formally refer to themselves as Nasurai (Nasoraeans) meaning guardians or possessors of secret rites and knowledge. The Mandaeans emphasize salvation of the soul through secret knowledge (gnosis) of its divine origin. Mandaeism "provides knowledge of whence we have come and whither we are going."

Christian usage
Despite rejection of Gnosticism, Christianity has sometimes used the term or derivatives of it in a laudatory rather than lambasting sense.

New Testament
The New Testament uses the term γνῶσις (Strong's G1108, Transliteration gnōsis) 28 times.

Patristic literature 
The Church Fathers used the word gnosis (knowledge) to mean spiritual knowledge or specific knowledge of the divine. This positive usage was to contrast it with how gnostic sectarians used the word. Cardiognosis ("knowledge of the heart") from Eastern Christianity related to the tradition of the starets and in Roman Catholic theology is the view that only God knows the condition of one's relationship with God.
Boston College Catholic philosopher Dermot Moran notes that

Eastern Orthodox thought 
Gnosis in Orthodox Christian (primarily Eastern Orthodox) thought is the spiritual knowledge of a saint (one who has obtained theosis) or mystically enlightened human being. Within the cultures of the term's provenance (Byzantine and Hellenic) Gnosis was a knowledge or insight into the infinite, divine and uncreated in all and above all, rather than knowledge strictly into the finite, natural or material world. Gnosis is transcendental as well as mature understanding. It indicates direct spiritual, experiential knowledge and intuitive knowledge, mystic rather than that from rational or reasoned thinking. Gnosis itself is gained through understanding at which one can arrive via inner experience or contemplation such as an internal epiphany of intuition and external epiphany such as the theophany.

In the Philokalia, it is emphasized that such knowledge is not secret knowledge but rather a maturing, transcendent form of knowledge derived from contemplation (theoria resulting from practice of hesychasm), since knowledge cannot truly be derived from knowledge, but rather, knowledge can only be derived from theoria (to witness, see (vision) or experience). Knowledge, thus plays an important role in relation to theosis (deification/personal relationship with God) and theoria (revelation of the divine, vision of God). Gnosis, as the proper use of the spiritual or noetic faculty plays an important role in Orthodox Christian theology. Its importance in the economy of salvation is discussed periodically in the Philokalia where as direct, personal knowledge of God (noesis) it is distinguished from ordinary epistemological knowledge (episteme—i.e., speculative philosophy).

Islam

Sufism 

Knowledge (or gnosis) in Sufism refers to knowledge of Self and God. The gnostic is called al-arif bi'lah or "one who knows by God". The goal of the Sufi practitioner is to remove inner obstacles to the knowledge of god. Sufism, understood as the quest for Truth, is to seek for the separate existence of the Self to be consumed by Truth, as stated by the Sufi poet Mansur al-Hallaj, who was executed for saying "I am the Truth" (ana'l haqq).

Jewish usage

Hellenistic Jewish literature 
The Greek word gnosis (knowledge) is used as a standard translation of the Hebrew word "knowledge" in the Septuagint, thus:

Philo also refers to the "knowledge" (gnosis) and "wisdom" (sophia) of God.

See also

References

Sources 

 

Gnosticism
Knowledge
Spiritual faculties
Theology